Trans Adriatic Pipeline (TAP) ( - Diadriatikós Agogós Fysikoú Aeríou) is a natural gas pipeline proposed in 2003, constructed in 2016, and operational since 2020, from Azerbaijan at the Caspian Sea to Europe from Greece through Albania and the Adriatic Sea to Italy. It is a European section of the Southern Gas Corridor.  capacity is 10 bcm per year.

The natural gas originates in the second stage of the Shah Deniz (Azerbaijan) gas field development in the Azerbaijani section of Caspian Sea flowing through the South Caucasus Pipeline and the Trans Anatolian Pipeline (TANAP). The TAP has been supported by European institutions and seen as a "Project of Common Interest" to enhance energy security and diversify gas supplies for European markets.
It is operated by a Swiss joint venture and owned by BP (20%), SOCAR (20%), Snam (20%), Fluxys (19%), Enagás (16%) and Axpo.

History 
The Trans Adriatic Pipeline project was announced in 2003 by Swiss energy company EGL Group (now named Axpo). The feasibility study was concluded in March 2006. Two options were investigated: a northern route through Bulgaria, North Macedonia and Albania, and a southern route through Greece and Albania, which finally was considered to be more feasible. In March 2007, the extended basic engineering for the pipeline was completed. Greece was opposed to having the route of the Trans Adriatic Pipeline pass through Albania, as it would allow Albania to become the transmission hub for gas in the Western Balkans.

On 13 February 2008, EGL Group and the Norwegian energy company Statoil signed an agreement to set up Trans Adriatic Pipeline AG, a joint venture to develop, build and operate the pipeline. In June 2008, the company filed an application with the Greek authorities to build a section of the pipeline from Thessaloniki to the Greek-Albanian border. In January 2009, the TAP carried out a marine survey in the Adriatic Sea to verify the offshore route. A route assessment survey in Albania started in July 2009. In March 2009, an intergovernmental agreement between Italy and Albania on energy cooperation mentioned TAP as a project of common interest for both countries. In January 2010, TAP opened country offices in Greece, Albania and Italy. In March 2010, TAP submitted an application to Italian authorities for inclusion into the Italian gas network.

On 20 May 2010, it was announced that E.ON becomes a partner in the project. The deal was closed on 7 July 2010.

In November 2010, TAP started a route refinement survey in northern Greece in preparation for the environmental impact assessment. On 7 September 2011, the company submitted an EU Third Party Access Exemption applications in all three host countries, which allows TAP AG to enter into long term ship-or-pay gas transportation agreements with the shippers of Shah Deniz II gas. The exemptions were granted on 16 May 2013.

In February 2012, the Trans Adriatic Pipeline was the first project to be pre-selected and to enter exclusive negotiations with the Shah Deniz Consortium. In August 2012, consortium partners BP, SOCAR and Total S.A. signed a funding agreement with TAP's shareholders, including an option to take up to 50% equity in the project. On 22 November 2012, the TAP consortium and Trans-Anatolian gas pipeline's partners signed a memorandum of understanding that establishes a cooperation framework between the two parties.

On 28 September 2012, Albania, Greece and Italy confirmed their political support for the pipeline by signing a memorandum of understanding. In February 2013, Greece, Italy and Albania signed an intergovernmental agreement.

In June 2013, the project was chosen as a route for gas from Shah Deniz II over the competing Nabucco West project. Later in 2013, BP, SOCAR, Total, and Fluxys became shareholders of the project. In September 2014, E.ON and Total sold their shares to Enagás and Fluxys. In December 2015, Snam joined TAP, acquiring Statoil's 20% interest in the project.

Construction of the pipeline started on 16 May 2016. On 15 November 2020, the pipeline began commercial operations, and the first Azerbaijani gas was delivered to Italy on 30 December 2020.

Technical description 

The pipeline starts at the Greece–Turkey border at Kipoi, Evros, where it is connected with the Trans-Anatolian gas pipeline. It crosses Greece, Albania and the Adriatic Sea and comes ashore in Italy near San Foca.

Total construction costs were about €4.5 billion. A third of it was spent for constructing the section within Albania.

The Gas Interconnector Greece-Bulgaria (IGB) is intended to connect Greece and Bulgaria.

Project company 

Trans Adriatic Pipeline AG is a joint venture company registered in Baar, canton Zug, Switzerland, with a purpose of planning, developing and building the TAP pipeline.
 The Managing Director of the company is Luca Schieppati.

Shareholders of the Trans Adriatic Pipeline are BP (20%), SOCAR (20%), Snam (20%), Fluxys (19%), Enagás (16%) and Axpo (5%).

Protests 
There have been incidents of protests by both local citizens and government officials against the Trans Adriatic Pipeline.

In Italy, the TAP required the construction of a gas terminal in a historical olive grove in the countryside near the Apulian town of Melendugno. The site presents some century-old olive trees which were explanted and transferred to an alternative location in an operation that cannot guarantee the trees' survival. This was criticised by the local public as well as environmentalists, also in relation to a deadly parasitic disease (Xylella fastidiosa) which has been affecting olive groves in the region for years, and can spread to previously unaffected areas with tree relocation.

Furthermore, the pipeline's landing point on the Italian coast is located under the pristine beach of San Foca, a popular destination for beachgoers. Locals and environmentalists raised safety concerns regarding millions of cubic litres of compressed flammable gas being piped only 10 metres under a beach which will be kept open to the public during the summer months.

Some government officials, such as multiple mayors from the area and the governor of the region of Apulia, also supported the environmentalists' opinion that the pipeline might cause more harm than good and could be an opportunity for local organised crime and corruption to infiltrate public tenders for construction work on the Italian side. They worried especially in relation to a taxpayer-funded 60-kilometre long interconnector which had to be built to link the TAP's Italian terminal in Melendugno to Italy's national gas network near the industrial port of Brindisi. In 2016, the Apulia Region governor Michele Emiliano told an Al Jazeera English crew that he could not understand why an alternative landing point to San Foca beach, closer to the Brindisi industrial area, was not chosen in spite of lower costs, less severe environmental impact, and proximity to pre-existing gas infrastructure.

See also 

 Interconnector Turkey–Greece–Italy
 Burgas–Alexandroupoli pipeline
 South Stream
 Nabucco pipeline
 Ionian Adriatic Pipeline
 TANAP

References

External links 
 

Natural gas pipelines in Greece
Natural gas pipelines in Albania
Natural gas pipelines in Italy
Albania–Greece relations
Albania–Italy relations
Greece–Italy relations
Pipelines under the Mediterranean Sea
Adriatic Sea
2020 establishments in Albania
2020 establishments in Greece
2020 establishments in Italy